The 1966 Campeonato Brasileiro Série A (officially the 1966 Taça Brasil) was the 8th edition of the Campeonato Brasileiro Série A.

Northern Zone

Northern Group

Northeastern Group

Northern Zone Decision

Southern Zone

Central Group

Southern Zone Finals

Quarterfinals

Semifinals
Santos and Fluminense enter in this stage

Finals

References

Sources

Bra
1966 in Brazilian football
Taça Brasil seasons
B